Vincenzo Nardiello (born 11 June 1966) is a retired former world champion Italian boxer in the super middleweight division.

Early life & amateur career
Nardiello was born in Stuttgart, Baden-Württemberg, West Germany. A former world champion in the super middleweight division, he and Roy Jones Jr. are best remembered as the two boxers who were controversially robbed of decisions against eventually Olympic light middleweight gold medalist Park Si-Hun in the last two rounds of the 1988 Olympics despite Nardiello and Jones clearly landing more punches in their bouts. Two of the judges in Jones versus Si-Hun finals were banned for life after the tournament, while the third admitted his card was a mistake, with Jones being named the outstanding fighter of the tournament. Si-Hun apologized and retired. The stain of the 'bad decisions' in the 1988 Olympics stayed with Nardiello and Jones for the rest of their careers. 36 of 37 Americans got decisions in boxing in the 1984 Olympics in the United States, and the South Koreans had vowed to get back at the American media for being terribly wronged in 1984, and Nardiello and Jones were targets of the South Korean scorecards of the time. Nardiello, who lost a 3–2 split decision Park Si-Hun, felt he had been cheated, argued with the officials at ringside and had to be physically dragged from the Seoul Olympics ring area.

Amateur achievements
1984 Italian superlightweight champion
1985 Silver Trofeo Italy
Lost Jose Luis Hernandez (Kuba) WO
1986 Italian superwelterweight champion
1986 Winner Trofeo Italy
Defeated Kalin Stoyanov (Bulgaria) KO 2
1987 Italian middleweight champion
Represented Italy as a Light Middleweight, at the 1988 Seoul Olympic Games. Results were:
1st round bye
Defeated Likou Aliu (Samoa) KO 3
Defeated Quinton Paynter (Bermuda) KO 2
Lost to Park Si-Hun (South Korea) 2–3
1988 Winner Trofeo Italia – Venice, Italy
Defeated Renato Mastria (Italy) 5–0
1989 Silver Box-Am Tournament – Huelva, Spain
 Defeated Javier Martinez (Espania) KO 3
 Lost to Theuer Marco (Germany) 0–5
1990 Winner Trofeo Italia – Venice, Italy
Defeated Miodrag Radulovic (Yugoslawia) 4–1
 Defeated Theuer Marco (Germany) 3–2

Professional career
Nardiello turned pro after the 1988 Olympics and won seventeen consecutive bouts. On 13 December 1991, Nardiello was stopped in the 11th round of his first world title bout by WBA Super Middleweight champion Victor Corboba in France. He then won and lost, regained and lost again the European Super Middleweight title in bouts in Italy and France. After knocking Massimiliano Bocchini in Italy,  Nardiello again challenged for a world title, but was stopped in the eighth round of a London bout against WBC Super Middleweight champion Nigel Benn, in Benn's first bout since his bout with Gerald McClellan who sustained critical injuries. Benn then lost his title to Thulani Malinga, lost his last three title bouts and retired in 1996. Nardiello qualified for another world title shot by knocking out Norberto Bueno in Italy. On 6 July 1996, in Manchester, England, Nardiello defeated WBC champion Thulani Malinga to win a share of the World Super Middleweight title in his third attempt. Nardiello lost the WBC title in Milan, Italy, later in 1996, when he was stopped by Robin Reid After winning three more bouts, Nardiello was unsuccessful in his final world title bout, getting stopped in the sixth round of a WBC World Super Middleweight title bout against Richie Woodhall (who had lost the 'other' 1988 Olympics semi-final bout to Jones) on 13 February 1999. Nardiello retired after winning a six-round decision over Glenn Odem in Italy on 29 May 1999.

Professional boxing record

Miscellaneous
Brother of Giovanni Nardiello, a former Italian Super Middleweight champion, who lost an IBF world title bout to Sven Ottke in his only world title opportunity.

See also
List of world super-middleweight boxing champions

References

External links

 

|-

1966 births
Living people
German male boxers
German sportspeople of Italian descent
Sportspeople from Stuttgart
Southpaw boxers
Italian male boxers
Olympic boxers of Italy
Boxers at the 1988 Summer Olympics
Super-middleweight boxers
World super-middleweight boxing champions
European Boxing Union champions
World Boxing Council champions